The Fremantle Traffic Bridge carries Queen Victoria Street over the Swan River, linking the suburbs of North Fremantle and Fremantle in Perth, Western Australia.

History

With the 1866 built bridge connecting North Fremantle and Fremantle in urgent need of replacement, work commenced on a replacement in November 1937. It was envisaged to have a short lifespan with Fremantle Harbour expected to be extended further east. Hence it was built out of timber rather than concrete. It opened on 15 December 1939.

Construction of a replacement bridge is scheduled to commence in 2022 with completion scheduled for 2025. In August 2021, the project was altered with the new bridge to be built to the west of the current bridge rather than the east.

References

External links

Bridges completed in 1939
Buildings and structures in Fremantle
Road bridges in Perth, Western Australia
Swan River (Western Australia)
1939 establishments in Australia